Lost in the Feeling is the forty-sixth studio album by American country music singer Conway Twitty. The album was released in 1983, by Warner Bros. Records. The model on the album cover was the late Naomi Judd.

Track listing

Charts

References

1983 albums
Conway Twitty albums
Warner Records albums
Albums produced by Jimmy Bowen